Lybrand is a surname of Swiss origin. Notable people with the surname include:

 Archibald Lybrand (1840–1910), American lawyer, soldier, businessman, and politician
 Lacie Lybrand (born 1982), American beauty queen
 Willa Lybrand Fulmer )1884–1968), American politician

References

See also
 Leibbrandt
 Liutprand (disambiguation)

Surnames of Swiss origin